Benton (formerly Benton Station) is a census-designated place (CDP) in Mono County, California, United States. The population of the CDP was 279 at the 2020 census.

Benton is in area codes 442 and 760 and ZIP code 93512. It was once a small mining town with up to 5,000 inhabitants. Many of the original buildings remain, and the town has never completely died.

The 160 acre (65 hectare) Benton Paiute Reservation, with about 50 full-time residents, is in the southwest part of the CDP, less than a mile south of Benton Hot Springs.

History
Benton is one of the oldest existing towns in Mono County. Benton was founded by the western Indians who came to make use of its hot springs. As the nearby towns of Bodie and Aurora grew in size and population, Benton soon became a checkpoint for southbound travelers in 1852.

Gold was discovered in the hills of Benton in 1862, and its population quickly grew. After the initial gold strike, little more was found. Benton's profits were soon primarily from silver. Unlike other mining towns, Benton was able to provide enough for the town to thrive and flourish for approximately 50 years. Although most mining activity occurred between 1862 and 1890, the town never completely collapsed.

The Carson and Colorado Railroad reached Benton in 1883.

Geography
Benton lies along U.S. Route 6 outside of Bishop, en route to remote areas of Nevada. California State Route 120 has its eastern terminus at US 6 in Benton. It leads southwest  to the Benton Hot Springs part of the CDP, then continues west  to U.S. Route 395 near Lee Vining.

US Route 6 crosses this border, then climbs over  Montgomery Pass at the northern end of the White Mountains. Benton has excellent views to the east of  Boundary Peak, Nevada's highest, and  Montgomery Peak just next to it in California.

It is primarily in the Benton Valley, drained to the south by Spring Canyon Creek, leading to the Hammil Valley and eventually to the Owens Valley. Benton Hot Springs, in the southwest part of the CDP, is in Blind Spring Valley, which drains northeast to Benton proper.

Climate
A weather station was run in the town from 1964 to 2013.  However, temperatures were recorded for only three of those years, and the record is thus very sparse.

Demographics

The 2010 United States Census reported that Benton had a population of 280. The population density was 9.8 people per square mile (3.8/km). The racial makeup of Benton was 199 (71.1%) White,0 (0.4%) African American, 37 (21.1%) Native American, 1 (0.4%) Asian, 0 (0.0%) Pacific Islander, 15 (5.4%) from other races, and 5 (1.8%) from two or more races.  Hispanic or Latino of any race were 38 persons (13.6%).

The Census reported that 280 people (100% of the population) lived in households, 0 (0%) lived in non-institutionalized group quarters, and 0 (0%) were institutionalized.

There were 122 households, out of which 29 (23.8%) had children under the age of 18 living in them, 59 (48.4%) were opposite-sex married couples living together, 9 (7.4%) had a female householder with no husband present, 7 (5.7%) had a male householder with no wife present.  There were 14 (11.5%) unmarried opposite-sex partnerships, and 1 (0.8%) same-sex married couples or partnerships. 40 households (32.8%) were made up of individuals, and 10 (8.2%) had someone living alone who was 65 years of age or older. The average household size was 2.30.  There were 75 families (61.5% of all households); the average family size was 2.81.

The population was spread out, with 54 people (19.3%) under the age of 18, 10 people (3.6%) aged 18 to 24, 58 people (20.7%) aged 25 to 44, 123 people (43.9%) aged 45 to 64, and 35 people (12.5%) who were 65 years of age or older.  The median age was 48.8 years. For every 100 females, there were 105.9 males.  For every 100 females age 18 and over, there were 103.6 males.

There were 159 housing units at an average density of 5.6 per square mile (2.2/km), of which 86 (70.5%) were owner-occupied, and 36 (29.5%) were occupied by renters. The homeowner vacancy rate was 1.1%; the rental vacancy rate was 15.6%.  191 people (68.2% of the population) lived in owner-occupied housing units and 89 people (31.8%) lived in rental housing units.

Education
Benton is in the Eastern Sierra Unified School District. An elementary school, Edna Beaman Elementary, is located in town. There was a high school, which was closed after the 2011-2012 school year.

Attractions
The hot springs are one of the major attractions in Benton, as well as fine bed and breakfast rooms and overnight soaking tubs. With the abandonment of travelers' services at nearby Montgomery Pass, it offers the only lodging, restaurant and gas station services within a 30-mile (50 km) radius. The Benton Crossing Cafe is owned and operated by Utu Utu Gwaitu Paiute Tribe of the Benton Paiute Reservation.

There are several old mines in the surrounding hills that have been a source of interest to tourists, as well as the hiking and mountain biking trails in the area. Many of the original buildings from the old mine town still exist and are open to exploration, including the cemetery.  Benton is a departure point for hiking to Nevada high point Boundary Peak via a (rough) 2WD road to Queen Mine at 9,200 ft (2,800m) or a 4WD extension to Kennedy Saddle at 9,900 ft (3,020m).

References

Census-designated places in Mono County, California
Census-designated places in California